Aunese Makoi Simati, born 22 April 1967, is a Tuvaluan diplomat. He was Tuvalu's Permanent Representative to the United Nations from 20 December 2012 to July 2017. 

He studied at Waikato University (New Zealand), obtaining a Master's degree in social science (economics and geography). He worked as a civil servant in the Tuvaluan Ministry of Finance, Economic Planning and Industries from 1991 to 2003, in the Department of Planning, rising to the position of Senior Assistant Secretary in that department in 1999. In 2003, he was promoted to the position of Acting Permanent Secretary in the Ministry of Communications and Transport, then became Permanent Secretary in the Ministry of Home Affairs and Rural Development in 2005; he returned to the Ministry of Finance, Economic Planning and Industries, as Permanent Secretary, in 2006.

In 2009, he began a diplomatic career, being appointed Permanent Secretary in the Department of Foreign Affairs, within the Office of the Prime Minister (who at that time was Apisai Ielemia). The following year, he was appointed as Tuvalu's High Commissioner to Fiji. On 20 December 2012, he presented his credentials to United Nations Secretary-General Ban Ki-moon, as Tuvalu's Permanent Representative to the United Nations. He simultaneously served as Tuvaluan Ambassador to the United States, having presented his credentials to President Barack Obama on 14 January 2013.

References

Tuvaluan diplomats
Permanent Representatives of Tuvalu to the United Nations
University of Waikato alumni
1967 births
Living people
Ambassadors of Tuvalu to the United States